Dong Hongjiao (born 28 April 1986) is a Paralympic athlete from China competing mainly in category T54 sprint events.

She competed in the 2008 Summer Paralympics in Beijing, China.  There she won a gold medal in the women's 4 x 100 metre relay - T53/54 event, a bronze medal in the women's 100 metres - T54 event and finished fifth in the women's 400 metres - T54 event

She took silver in the 2012 Summer Paralympics in London.

References

External links
 

1986 births
Living people
Chinese female sprinters
Paralympic athletes of China
Paralympic gold medalists for China
Paralympic bronze medalists for China
Athletes (track and field) at the 2008 Summer Paralympics
Athletes (track and field) at the 2012 Summer Paralympics
Medalists at the 2008 Summer Paralympics
Medalists at the 2012 Summer Paralympics
Paralympic medalists in athletics (track and field)
21st-century Chinese women